Burkina Faso is a landlocked African country located in the middle of West Africa. It has a population of 13.9 million people.

Workers have the right to organise trade unions, engage in collective bargaining, and strike for better pay and working conditions.  Unions have held an important role in Burkina Faso in the stabilization of government.  For example, in 1966 the first of several military coups placed Lt. Col. Sangoule Lamizana at the head of a government of senior army officers. Lamizana remained in power throughout the 1970s, as President of military and then elected governments but with the support of unions and civil groups, Col. Saye Zerbo overthrew President Lamizana in the 1980 Upper Voltan coup d'état. However, Colonel Zerbo also encountered resistance from trade unions and was overthrown in 1982 by Jean-Baptiste Ouedraogo and the Council of Popular Salvation.

See also

 List of companies based in Burkina Faso